

This is a list of the National Register of Historic Places listings in Providence County, Rhode Island.

This is intended to be a complete list of the properties and districts on the National Register of Historic Places in Providence County, Rhode Island, United States. Latitude and longitude coordinates are provided for many National Register properties and districts; these locations may be seen together in a map.

There are 434 properties and districts listed on the National Register in the county, including 15 National Historic Landmarks. The cities of Pawtucket, Woonsocket, and Providence include 57, 43, and 169 of these properties and districts — including 1 and 12 National Historic Landmarks — respectively; they are listed separately. Properties and districts located in the county's other municipalities, including 2 National Historic Landmarks, are listed here.  The Blackstone Canal, which extends through Providence, Pawtucket, Woonsocket, and other communities appears here and on the Providence and Pawtucket lists; the Conant Thread-Coats & Clark Mill Complex District is in both Central Falls and Pawtucket, and is thus listed below and on the Pawtucket list.  The Norwood Avenue Historic District is located in both Providence and Cranston.

Current listings

Pawtucket

Providence

Woonsocket

Other communities

|}

See also

 List of National Historic Landmarks in Rhode Island
 National Register of Historic Places listings in Rhode Island

References

 
Providence